Burpengary–Caboolture Road is a continuous  road route in the Moreton Bay local government area of Queensland, Australia. It is designated as part of State Route 60. It is a state-controlled district road (number 406), rated as a local road of regional significance (LRRS). 

Burpengary–Caboolture Road is known locally (with Local and State Government approval) as Morayfield Road.

Route description
It runs west, passing the Burpengary Service Road to the south-east, and turning north-west before entering , where it passes the exit to Graham Road to the north-east. It crosses the North Coast railway line and continues to the north-west until it reaches the exit to Oakey Flat Road to the south-west.

From there the road continues north-west until it reaches the exit to Caboolture River Road to the west, where it turns north and enters . It continues north, crossing the Caboolture River into , where it ends at an intersection with Caboolture Connection Road (King Street).

Land use along the road is mainly retail with some rural and some light industrial.

Road condition
The road is fully sealed, and most of it is four lane divided road.

Upgrade projects
A lead project to improve safety on sections of this road and Beerburrum Road, at a cost of $28.8 million, was under construction in July 2022, with some sub-projects already completed.

History

Burpengary was first settled by Europeans in the 1870s, and the first industry was mainly timber-cutting.

In 1868 a sugar plantation was established in what is now Morayfield.

The Caboolture area was colonised by European people in 1842 when the land around the Moreton Bay penal colony was opened up to free settlers. By the mid-1860s farms had been established and the local pastoralists were experimenting with sugar cane and cotton.

This road, including a bridge over the Caboolture River, existed as Morayfield Road (also Gympie Road) in 1901. It was part of the Bruce Highway when it was declared in 1934, and remained so until August 1966, when the Caboolture Bypass Stage 1 was completed between Burpengary Creek and Bribie Island Road.

Future usage
Land several kilometres to the west of the road is the site of a new regional city to be known as Caboolture West. It is planned that, over the next 40 years, it will grow to accommodate 30,000 new homes with a population of 70,000. It is expected that this development will result in increased traffic on Morayfield Road, as well as other roads in the area. Southbound traffic will continue to increase until completion of Stage 3 of the Bruce Highway Western Alternative.

Prior to the 2022 Federal election the then Coalition Government promised to commit $100 million to build a new road from the Caboolture River Road intersection to Buchanan Road, with a bridge over the railway line. If built, it is expected that this would take a substantial amount of northbound traffic off Morayfield Road.

Major intersections
All distances are from Google Maps. The entire road is within the Moreton Bay local government area.

See also

 List of road routes in Queensland
 List of numbered roads in Queensland

Notes

References

Roads in Queensland